Terry R. Means (born 1948) is a senior United States district judge of the United States District Court for the Northern District of Texas.

Education and career

Born in Roswell, New Mexico, Means received a Bachelor of Arts degree from Southern Methodist University in 1971 and a Juris Doctor from Southern Methodist University School of Law in 1974. He was in private practice in Corsicana, Texas from 1974 to 1989. He was a Justice, Texas Court of Appeals, 10th Appellate District, Waco, from 1989 to 1991.

Federal judicial service

Means was nominated by President George H. W. Bush on July 24, 1991, to a seat vacated by Judge David Owen Belew Jr. He was confirmed by the United States Senate on October 31, 1991, and received his commission on November 5, 1991. He was the judge in the trials of the men responsible for the murder of Lisa Rene. Means took senior status on July 3, 2013.

References

Sources

1948 births
Living people
Judges of the United States District Court for the Northern District of Texas
People from Roswell, New Mexico
Southern Methodist University alumni
United States district court judges appointed by George H. W. Bush
20th-century American judges
21st-century American judges